In antiquity, Paeonia or Paionia was the land and kingdom of the Paeonians or Paionians.

The exact original boundaries of Paeonia, like the early history of its inhabitants, are obscure, but it is known that it roughly corresponds to most of present-day North Macedonia and north-central parts of Greek Macedonia (i.e. probably the Greek municipalities of Paionia [excluding the village of Evropos], Almopia, Sintiki, Irakleia, and Serres), and a small part of south-western Bulgaria. Ancient authors placed it south of Dardania (an area corresponding to modern-day Kosovo and northern North Macedonia), west of the Thracian mountains, and east of the southernmost Illyrians. It was separated from Dardania by the mountains through which the Vardar river passes from the field of Scupi (modern Skopje) to the valley of Bylazora (near modern Sveti Nikole).

In the Iliad, the Paeonians are said to have been allies of the Trojans. During the Persian invasion of Greece the conquered Paeonians as far as the Lake Prasias, including the Paeoplae and Siropaiones, were deported from Paeonia to Asia.

In 355–354 BC, Philip II of Macedon took advantage of the death of King Agis of Paeonia and campaigned against them in order to conquer them. So the southern part of ancient Paeonia was annexed by the ancient kingdom of Macedon and was named "Macedonian Paeonia"; this section included the cities Astraion (later Stromnitsa), Stenae (near modern Demir Kapija), Antigoneia (near modern Negotino), etc.

Paeonian people

Tribes 

The Paeonian tribes were:
 Agrianes (also, Agriani and Agrii), it is also claimed that the tribe was Thracian.
 Almopians (also Almopioi)
 Laeaeans (also Laeaei and Laiai)
 Derrones (also Derroni), it is also claimed that the tribe was Thracian.
 Odomantes (also Odomanti), it is also claimed that the tribe was Thracian. 
 Paeoplae
 Doberes
 Siropaiones

Origin 

There is relatively little mention of the Paeonians in the works of the ancient Greeks. Some modern scholars consider the Paeonians to have been of either Thracian, or of mixed Thraco-Illyrian origins, Some of the personal names of individual Paeonians are, however, definitely Hellenic (Lycceius, Ariston, Audoleon), although relatively little is known about them; additionally their coins and toponyms are also Greek, which has led some scholars to believe that the Paeonians were of Greek origin. According to Radoslav Katičić, the possibility that the Paeonians took part in the "great Greek migration" and remained behind on the route cannot be ruled out. Linguistically, the very small number of surviving words in the Paeonian language have been variously connected to its neighboring languages – Illyrian and Thracian (and every possible Thraco-Illyrian mix in between), as well as to Greek but with a great deal of Illyrian and Thracian influence as a result of their proximity. Several eastern Paeonian tribes, including the Agrianes, clearly fell within the Thracian sphere of influence. Yet, according to the national legend, they were Teucrian colonists from Troy. Homer speaks of Paeonians from the Axios fighting on the side of the Trojans, but the Iliad does not mention whether the Paeonians were kin to the Trojans, and instead connects them to the Phrygians. Herodotus and Thucydides distinguish the Pannonians from the Thracians. Appian wrote of a genealogy in which Paion, the eponym of the Paeonians, is the son of Autarieus, the eponym of the Autariatae, and father of Skordiskos and Triballos, the eponyms of two central Balkanic tribes, one Celtic and the other Thracian. This might connect the Paeonians with the Illyrian complex, although as Katičić suggests, Appian might not refer to the Paeonians but might refer instead to the Pannonians, since Appian uses the Paeonian name to denote that ethnic group as well. Pausanias tells us of another genealogy, which connects the Paeonians with the Peloponnesian Epeians; Paion is said to be the son of Endymion and brother of Epeius and Aitolus. This version, indeed, establishes a Greek affiliation for the Paeonians. Homer calls the Paeonian leader Pyraechmes (parentage unknown);  later on in the Iliad (Book 21), Homer mentions a second leader, Asteropaeus, son of Pelagon.

Before the reign of Darius Hystaspes, they had made their way as far east as Perinthus in Thrace on the Propontis. At one time all Mygdonia, together with Crestonia, was subject to them. When Xerxes crossed Chalcidice on his way to Therma (later renamed Thessalonica), he is said to have marched through Paeonian territory. They occupied the entire valley of the Axios (Vardar) as far inland as Stobi, the valleys to the east of it as far as the Strymon and the country round Astibus and the river of the same name, with the water of which they anointed their kings. Emathia, roughly the district between the Haliacmon and Axios, was once called Paeonia; and Pieria and Pelagonia were inhabited by Paeonians. As a consequence of the growth of Macedonian power, and under pressure from their Thracian neighbors, their territory was considerably diminished, and in historical times was limited to the north of Macedonia from Illyria to the Strymon.

In Greek mythology, the Paeonians were said to have derived their name from Paeon the son of Endymion.

Paeonian Kingdom 

In early times, the chief town and seat of the Paeonian kings was Bylazora (now Veles in North Macedonia) on the Vardar; later, the seat of the kings was moved to Stobi (near modern Gradsko).

Subjugation of the Paeonians happened as a part of Persian military operations initiated by Darius the Great (521–486) in 513 – after immense preparations – a huge Achaemenid army invaded the Balkans and tried to defeat the European Scythians roaming to the north of the Danube river. Darius' army subjugated several Thracian peoples, and virtually all other regions that touch the European part of the Black Sea, such as parts of nowadays Bulgaria, Romania, Ukraine, and Russia, before it returned to Asia Minor. Darius left in Europe one of his commanders named Megabazus whose task was to accomplish conquests in the Balkans. The Persian troops subjugated gold-rich Thrace, the coastal Greek cities, as well as defeating and conquering the powerful Paeonians.

At some point after the Greco-Persian Wars, the Paeonian princedoms coalesced into a kingdom centred in the central and upper reaches of the Axios and Strymon rivers, corresponding with today's northern part of North Macedonia and western Bulgaria. They joined with the Illyrians to attack the northern areas of the kingdom of Macedonia. The Illyrians, who had a culture of piracy, would have been cut off from some trade routes if movement through this land had been blocked. They unsuccessfully attacked the northern defences of Macedonian territory in an attempt to occupy the region. In 360–359 BC, southern Paeonian tribes were launching raids into Macedon, (Diodorus XVI. 2.5) in support of an Illyrian invasion.

The Macedonian Royal House was thrown into a state of uncertainty by the death of Perdiccas III, but his brother Philip II assumed the throne, reformed the army (providing phalanxes), and proceeded to stop both the Illyrian invasion and the Paeonian raids through the boundary of the "Macedonian Frontier", which was the northern perimeter which he intended to defend as an area of his domain. He followed Perdiccas's success in 358 BC with a campaign deep into the north, into Paeonia itself. This reduced the Paeonian kingdom (then ruled by Agis) to a semi-autonomous, subordinate status, which led to a process of gradual and formal Hellenization of the Paeonians, who, during the reign of Philip II, began to issue coins with Greek legends like the Macedonian ones. A Paeonian contingent, led by Ariston, was attached to Alexander the Great's army.

At the time of the Persian invasion, the Paeonians on the lower Strymon had lost, while those in the north maintained, their territorial integrity. The daughter of Audoleon, a king of Paeonia, was the wife of Pyrrhus, king of Epirus, and Alexander the Great wished to bestow the hand of his sister Cynane upon Langarus, king of the Agrianians, who had shown himself loyal to Philip II.

Kings 

 Agis (died 358 BC)
 Lycceius (356–340 BC)
 Patraus (340–315 BC)
 Audoleon (315–285 BC), son of Patraus
 Ariston  (286–285 BC), son of Audoleon
 Leon (278–250 BC)
 Dropion (250–230 BC), son of Leon
 Bastareus (?–? BC)

 Main line
 Agis: founded the Paeonian kingdom; pretender to the Macedonian throne in a time of instability.
 Lycceius: joined anti-Macedonian coalition with Grabos II and Thrace in 356 BC.
 Patraus
 Audoleon: reduced to great straits by the Autariatae, but was succoured by Cassander.
 Ariston
 Leon of Paeonia: consolidated and restored lost lands after the Gallic Invasions in 280/279 BC.
 Dropion: last known Paeonian king in 230 BC, of a dwindling kingdom.

Others
 Pigres: one of the two tyrant brothers which in 511 BC persuaded Darius I to deport the coastal Paeonians to Asia.
 Mantyes: one of the two tyrant brothers which in 511 BC persuaded Darius I to deport the coastal Paeonians to Asia.
 Dokidan: of the Derrones; reigned during the 6th century BC.
 Dokim: of the Derrones; reigned during the 6th century BC.
 Euergetes: of the Derrones; reigned c. 480–465 BC, known only from his coinage.
 Teutaos: reigned from c. 450–435 BC; known only from his coinage.
 Bastareus: reigned from c. 400–380/78 BC, known only from his coinage.
 Teutamado: reigned from 378 to 359 BC, known only from his coinage.
 Symnon: great ally of Phillip II from 348 to 336 BC.
 Nicharchos: reigned from 335 to 323 BC; son of Symon.
 Langarus: of the Agrianes; invaded the territory of the Autariatae in 335 BC in coalition with Alexander the Great.
 Dyplaios: of the Agrianes; reigned around 330 BC.
 Didas: allied Philip V of Macedon with 4,000 warriors from 215 to 197 BC.

Foreign rulers 

 Persian
 Darius I: subjugated Paeonia in 511/2 BC.
 Xerxes: included Paeonians in vast Persian army of 481 BC, for the Invasion of Greece.

 Thracian
 Sitalces: included Agrianes and Laeaeans in his Macedonian campaign in 429 BC.

Culture 

The Paeonians included several independent tribes, all later united under the rule of a single king. Little is known of their manners and customs. They adopted the cult of Dionysus, known amongst them as Dyalus or Dryalus, and Herodotus mentions that the Thracian and Paeonian women offered sacrifice to Queen Artemis (probably Bendis). They worshipped the sun in the form of a small round disk fixed on the top of a pole. A passage in Athenaeus seems to indicate the affinity of their language with Mysian. They drank barley beer and various decoctions made from plants and herbs. The country was rich in gold and a bituminous kind of wood (or stone, which burst into a blaze when in contact with water) called  (or ).

The scanty remains of the Paeonian language do not allow a firm judgement to be made. On one side are Wilhelm Tomaschek and Paul Kretschmer, who claim it belonged to the Illyrian family, and on the other side is Dimitar Dečev, who claims affinities with Thracian. On the other hand, the Paeonian kings issued coins from the time of Philip II of Macedon onwards, bearing their names written in straightforward Greek. All the names of the Paeonian Kings that have come down to us are, in fact, explainable with and clearly related to Greek (Agis, Ariston, Audoleon, Lycceius, etc.), a fact that, according to Irwin L. Merker, puts into question the theories of Illyrian and Thracian connections.

The women were famous for their industry. In this connection Herodotus tells the story that Darius, having seen at Sardis a beautiful Paeonian woman carrying a pitcher on her head, leading a horse to drink, and spinning flax, all at the same time, inquired who she was. Having been informed that she was a Paeonian, he sent instructions to Megabazus, commander in Thrace, to deport two tribes of the nation without delay to Asia. An inscription, discovered in 1877 at Olympia on the base of a statue, states that it was set up by the community of the Paeonians in honor of their king and founder Dropion. Another king, whose name appears as Lyppeius on a fragment of an inscription found at Athens relating to a treaty of alliance, is no doubt identical with the Lycceius or Lycpeius of Paeonian coins.

Decline 

In 280 BC, the Gallic invaders under Brennus ravaged the land of the Paeonians, who, being further hard pressed by the Dardani, had no alternative but to join the Macedonians. Despite their combined efforts, however, the Paeonians and Macedonians were defeated. After the Celtic invasion of the Balkans weakened the state of the Macedonians and Paeonians, the political and military role of the Dardanians began to grow in the region. They expanded their state to the area of Paeonia which definitively disappeared from history. In 230 the Dardani under Longarus captured Bylazora from the Paeonians.
Paeonia consolidated again but, in 217 BC, the Macedonian king Philip V of Macedon (220–179 BC), the son of Demetrius II, succeeded in uniting and incorporating into his empire the separate regions of Dassaretia and Paeonia. A mere 70 years later (in 168 BC), Roman legions conquered Macedon in turn, and a new and much larger Roman province bearing this name was formed. Paeonia around the Axios formed the second and third districts respectively of the newly constituted Roman province of Macedonia. Centuries later under Diocletian, Paeonia and Pelagonia formed a province called Macedonia Secunda or Macedonia Salutaris, belonging to the Praetorian prefecture of Illyricum.

See also 

List of ancient Illyrian peoples and tribes
List of ancient tribes in Thrace

References

Bibliography 

Pausanias, Description of Greece. W. H. S. Jones (translator). Loeb Classical Library. Cambridge, MA: Harvard University Press; London, William Heinemann Ltd. (1918). Vol. 1. Books I–II: .
Smith, William, A dictionary of Greek and Roman biography and mythology. London. Online at Perseus

 
 
Macedonia (ancient kingdom)
Achaemenid Empire